Frank Kendall III (born January 26, 1949) is an American engineer, lawyer and executive who is the 26th and current United States Secretary of the Air Force. He has served in several senior positions in the U.S. Department of Defense. A West Point graduate (Class of 1971, Distinguished Graduate), he retired as a Lieutenant colonel LTC from the U.S. Army Reserve. From 2011 to 2017, Kendall served as the Under Secretary of Defense for Acquisition, Technology and Logistics in the Obama Administration. He is a member of the Democratic Party.

Early career

Kendall began his career as a U.S. Army officer. After several assignments including postings to Germany and teaching engineering at West Point, he joined the civil service working as a systems engineer in missile defense. In 1986, he became the Assistant Deputy Under Secretary for Strategic Defense Systems as a member of the Senior Executive Service. From 1989 to 1994, he served as acting and then permanent Deputy Director of Defense Research and Engineering with responsibility for all U.S. conventional weapon systems research and development programs. After leaving government service in 1994, Kendall served as Corporate Vice President of Engineering at Raytheon and later as a consultant. During this period, Kendall acquired a J.D. degree from Georgetown University Law Center and worked on a pro bono basis as a human rights attorney.

Obama Administration
In 2010 Kendall returned to government, first as Principal Under Secretary and then Under Secretary of Defense for Acquisition, Technology and Logistics.

During his tenure as Under Secretary, Kendall implemented policies that led to substantial improvements in the cost and schedule performance of the Defense Department's weapons acquisition programs. In 2016, he was recognized as Person of the Year by Aviation Week and Space Technology for his cost control efforts. In addition to the policy changes he initiated and executed under the "Better Buying Power" initiatives he directly oversaw over 50 of the largest defense weapons programs. Examples include the F-35 Joint Strike Fighter program where he froze production for two years to incentivize efforts to stabilize the design, the GPS 3 ground system, OCX, where he led the effort to restructure and complete this troubled program. He oversaw the initiation of the  development of the B-21 Long Range Strike Bomber which is currently executing to plan. He formulated and led the effort to acquire the Military Health System GENESIS (MHS GENESIS) program, modern healthcare management system that has been adopted by the Department of Veterans Affairs as well as the Defense Department. Kendall led the effort to support operations in Iraq and Afghanistan with rapid acquisition programs and he led the effort to remove Syrian chemical weapons from that country and destroy them at sea. Kendall was a major sponsor for innovation, launching the Defense Advanced Research Projects Agency led Aerospace Innovation Initiative. He raised alarms about Chinese military modernization and the threat it posed to U.S. conventional military superiority. While in office he authored the articles on defense acquisition that he compiled in his book “Getting Defense Acquisition Right".

Biden Administration

On April 27, 2021, President Joe Biden announced Kendall as his nominee to be the 26th Secretary of the Air Force. His Senate confirmation occurred after almost three months of deliberation, due to holds by Senators Mike Lee, Gary Peters and Elizabeth Warren, the latter of whom released her hold after Kendall agreed to extend his post-governmental recusal agreements from two to four years. Kendall was eventually confirmed by voice vote on June 26, 2021, administratively sworn in on July 28, 2021 and ceremonially sworn in by Secretary of Defense Lloyd Austin on August 4, 2021.

References

External links

 

|-

 
|-

 

1949 births
American lawyers
Biden administration personnel
California Institute of Technology alumni
Georgetown University Law Center alumni
Living people
Long Island University alumni
Obama administration personnel
People from Pittsfield, Massachusetts
United States Military Academy alumni
United States Secretaries of the Air Force
United States Under Secretaries of Defense